Cosmochilus cardinalis is a species of cyprinid in the genus Cosmochilus. It inhabits the Mekong in Yunnan, China.

References

Cyprinidae
Freshwater fish of China
Cyprinid fish of Asia